Oxofluoxymesterone (developmental code name U-6596), or ketofluoxymesterone, is an androgen and anabolic steroid (AAS) which was never marketed. It was assessed in the treatment of breast cancer in women in the 1970s and showed effectiveness similar to that of other AAS. The drug is the 11-dehydrogenated analogue and a metabolite of fluoxymesterone.

See also
 Dihydrofluoxymesterone

References

Abandoned drugs
Tertiary alcohols
Androgens and anabolic steroids
Androstanes
Diketones
Hepatotoxins
Hormonal antineoplastic drugs
Human drug metabolites
Organofluorides